The Judicial Districts of Peru are subdivisions of the Judicial System of Peru. There are 34  Judicial Districts in Peru:

See also
Judicial System of Peru
Subdivisions of Peru
Superior Courts of Peru

References

Judicial Districts of Peru